Chillicothe may refer to:
Chillicothe, Ohio
Chillicothe Turnpike, a highway
Chillicothe Paints, a collegiate summer baseball team
Chillicothe, Illinois
Chillicothe, Iowa
Chillicothe, Missouri
Chillicothe, Texas
Chillicothe (film), a 1999 film by Todd Edwards

See also
 Chalahgawtha, an alternate spelling of "Chillicothe"